INAS 343 (Indian Naval Air Squadron 343) is an aviation squadron of the Indian Navy, operating IAI Heron and IAI Searcher MkII UAVs based at Porbandar. It is the second squadron in the navy dedicated to operating UAVs after INAS 342 at Kochi.

The Searcher is a third-generation UAV. Heron is the bigger version of Searcher MKII and has a wingspan of about 16 metres. The Searcher carries a modern and sophisticated electro optic camera and a communication intelligence payload. Heron is equipped with a maritime patrol radar. Both the UAVs have long endurance capabilities, can operate before and after sunset and beam real time live pictures of maritime targets. The Searcher MkII has a cruise speed of about 100 knots, a service ceiling of 20,000 feet and an 18-hour
endurance. The Heron can touch speeds of over 100 knots with a service
ceiling of 30,000 feet and an endurance of 40 hours.

References

External links
http://www.rediff.com/news/slide-show/slide-show-1-indias-second-uav-squadron-commissioned/20110118.htm

Aircraft squadrons of the Indian Navy
Naval units and formations of India